Loperot is a primate fossil site, located within Kenya's Rift Valley Province, approximately 50 km west of Lake Turkana.

References 

Populated places in Turkana County